Williams Point is a small community just outside the town of Antigonish, Nova Scotia.

References

Communities in Antigonish County, Nova Scotia